White Darkness is a sixth studio album by the Swedish rock band Nightingale, released by Black Mark Production in 2007.

The Chinese characters embossed on the digipak cover means "never give up".

Track listing

Personnel
Nightingale
 Dan Swanö - guitars, lead vocals, keyboards
 Dag Swanö - guitar, backing vocals, keyboards
 Erik Oskarsson - bass guitar, backing vocals
 Tom Björn - drums, keyboards (on track 6)

Additional musician
 Thomas Lassar - synthesizers (on track 8), Hammond organ (on track 9)

Production
 Dan Swanö - engineering, mixing, mastering
 Erik Ohlsson - cover art, layout, band photography

References

Nightingale (band) albums
2007 albums